Eggs of Steel: Charlie's Eggcellent Adventure, or Eggs of Steel for short, known in Japan as , is a platform game developed by Rhythm and Hues Studios and published by Enix and Atlus USA for PlayStation in 1998.

Reception

The game received unfavorable reviews. In Japan, Famitsu gave it a score of 26 out of 40.

Notes

References

External links
 

1998 video games
Atlus games
Eggs in culture
Enix games
Platform games
PlayStation (console) games
PlayStation (console)-only games
Video games developed in the United States